Jean-Louis Scaringella, (born 16 July 1948, in Grenoble, Isère, France) is a graduate of the HEC Paris and Harvard Business School. In November 1999 he became the Dean of, and Professor of International Business at, the European School of Management ESCP-EAP.

He is currently Deputy Director General of the CCIP, responsible for Research, Forecasting and Innovation. As CEO of the ESCP-EAP, he facilitated the merger of it, and HEC jeunes filles; two prestigious French 'Grandes Ecoles' - the new group is an institution dedicated to world business studies.

Scaringella is also a board member of the EFMD (European Foundation for Management Development), a board member of the Diplomatic and Strategic Studies Centre (CEDS), a member of the editorial board of the European Management Journal and the Expansion Management Review, an associate professor at the Panthéon-Assas University, and a Defence Advisor to the Secretary General of National Defence.

Degrees
Doctorate in Economics Sorbonne, Paris (1970)
Harvard Business School (1972)
Doctorate in Law.

Career
1970 - 1978: Professor of Finance at the École des Hautes Études Commerciales;
1978 - 1983: Director of the Institut Supérieur des affaires (HEC MBA);
1983 - 1984: Deputy Director of Education of the Chamber of Commerce and Industry of Paris (CCIP);
1984 - 1989: Director of Communications of the CCIP;
1989 - 1992: Director of the École des Hautes Études Commerciales (HEC);
1993 - 1999: Director General, Centre for Development Affairs;
1999 - 2006: Director General of ESCP-EAP (Paris, London, Madrid, Berlin, Turin);
Since 2006: Deputy Director General of the CCIP.

Publications
The Defence Industries in Europe - Economica 1998 
RH : les meilleures pratiques des entreprises du Cac 40 - Editions d'Organisation 2003 
L'Art du management de l'information (The Art of Information Management) - (en coll., 2007)
L'art de la dirigeance (en coll., 2007)
Stratégies d’Internationalisation Dunod 1997
Handbook of Top Management Teams (editor) - Palgrave Macmillan 2010

Decorations
Officer of the Legion of Honor;
Commandeur de l' ordre national du Mérite (Commander of the National Order of Merit);
Commandeur des Palmes académiques (Commander of the Academic Palms);
Officer of the Order of Merit of the Federal Republic of Germany (Officer of the Order of Merit of the Federal Republic of Germany);
Fellow of the Royal Society of Arts;
Commandeur de l'Ordre du Mérite Culturel de la Bolivie (Commander of the Order of Cultural Merit of Bolivia);
Officier de l'Ordre National du Mérite du Sénégal (Officer of the Order of Merit of Senegal);
Chevalier de l'Ordre National du Burkina Faso.

See also
ESCP-EAP European School of Management

References

1948 births
Living people
People from Grenoble
Harvard Business School alumni
Officiers of the Légion d'honneur
Commandeurs of the Ordre des Palmes Académiques
Commanders of the Ordre national du Mérite
Officers Crosses of the Order of Merit of the Federal Republic of Germany